Kaalamellam Kadhal Vaazhga is a 1997 Indian Tamil-language romantic drama film directed by R. Balu in his debut and produced by Sivasakthi Pandian. The film featured Murali alongside Kausalya, in her Tamil debut role, while Gemini Ganesan, Manivannan, Charle, Vivek, and *Karan play supporting roles. This film completed 200 days at the box office and was a 'blockbuster hit'. The film was remade in Kannada as Kushalave Kshemave with Ramesh Aravind and Srilakshmi.

Plot 
Jeeva is the college boy and singer (with bundles of commitments belonging to the lower middle class) who enchants the rich college girl Kausalya with his musical skills. Kausalya, the music buff who is in the habit of appreciating good singers over the phone, does it with Jeeva also. The telephonic voice of Kausalya turns out to have a tremendously magical romantic effect upon the hero, who besides falling in love head over heels with her, wants to see her.

Cast

Murali as Jeeva
Kausalya as Kausalya
Gemini Ganesan as Kausalya's grandfather
Manivannan as Nayar
Charle as Perumal
Vivek as Haridas
Karan as Prakash
R. Sundarrajan as Principal Venkatraman 
Vennira Aadai Moorthy as Vice Principal Narasimhan
Kovai Sarala as Elizabeth
Shanmugasundaram as Jeeva's father
Pandu as Sanjay Kujidabadham
Rajeev as Psychiatrist (Special appearance)
Nassar as Hariharan (Special appearance)
Ramji as Rama (Special appearance)
P. B. Sreenivas as himself (Special appearance)

Production
Following the release of director Agathiyan's Kadhal Kottai (1996), aspiring director Balu claimed that Agathiyan had stolen the story of the film from his half-complete venture Un Ninaivaaga. To appease Balu, producer Sivasakthi Pandian offered him the chance to make a film for his production studio. The film was named after a song from Kadhal Kottai. Kavitha made her Tamil debut with this film, and Balu gave her the screen name Kausalya.

Release
A critic from Indolink.com stated that "overall, if it is a long time since you saw a movie with good comedy, above average music and crystal clear photography, here is one for you."

The success of Kadhal Kottai and Kalamellam Kadhal Vaazhga, prompted Sivashakthi Pandian to announce another love story Kaadhale Nimmadhi soon after this film's release.

Soundtrack

The soundtrack of the film was composed by Deva, was well received by the audience. The lyrics written by Deva, Palani Bharathi and Ponniyin Selvan.

References

1997 films
1997 romantic drama films
Indian romantic drama films
Tamil films remade in other languages
Films scored by Deva (composer)
1990s Tamil-language films
1997 directorial debut films